Dry Valley is a valley in Reynolds County in the U.S. state of Missouri.

Dry Valley was so named for the fact the valley often runs dry.

References

Valleys of Reynolds County, Missouri
Valleys of Missouri